Qissa Panjab is a 2015 Punjabi film directed by Jatinder Mauhar, is a story of six individuals and how their lives take a significant turn when they meet each other.

Cast
Preet Bhullar
Kul Sidhu
Dheeraj Kumar 
Jagjeet Sandhu 
Aman Dhaliwal 
Harshjot Kaur
Amrat Sandhu

Music
Bolian  -  Manna Mand
Jinde meriye -  Nooran Sisters
Rog  -  Gurdas Maan
Rutt Pyaar Di - Manna Mand

Reception

Box office

Critical response
Jasmine Singh of The Tribune wrote that film is "indeed a praise-worthy effort to come out with the real and existing scenario of Punjab".

References

2015 films
Punjabi-language Indian films
2010s Punjabi-language films